The Ven.  Henry Fearon (born Ockenden, 20 June 1802; died Loughborough 13 June 1885) was Archdeacon of Leicester from 1863 until 1884.
 
Fearon was born in Ockenden, Cuckfield, Sussex on 20 June 1802, the son of the Rev. Joseph Francis Fearon. He was educated at Emmanuel College, Cambridge, where he graduated B.A. in 1824, M.A. in 1827 and B.D. in 1834. He was ordained deacon in 1826 and priest in 1827. He was the Rector of Loughborough from 1848 until his death.

Notes

1802 births
Alumni of Emmanuel College, Cambridge
Archdeacons of Leicester
1885 deaths
People from Cuckfield